Parioglossus palustris, the Borneo hoverer goby, is a species of dartfish native to the Andaman Sea and West Pacific.

This fish is usually found near mangrove trees.

References

palustris
Fauna of Indonesia
Fish described in 1945